Die Amigos is a German music band.

In Germany the band Die Amigos is a popular band of German Schlager songs. Bernd Ulrich (keyboard and singer), Karl-Heinz Ulrich (singer) and Daniela Alfinito (singer since 2000) are members of the band. The band was founded in year 1970.

Discography

Albums

Song books 
(German language)
 2006: Das Beste der Amigos Songbuch
 2006: Melodien der Herzen Songbuch
 2006: Ihre großen Erfolge Songbuch
 2006: Weihnachten daheim Songbuch
 2007: Der helle Wahnsinn Songbuch
 2008: Ein Tag im Paradies Songbuch
 2008: CD- & Buch-Kombination
 2009: Sehnsucht, die wie Feuer brennt Songbuch

Awards 

 2011: Echo
 2009 and 2010: Krone der Volksmusik

External links 

 Official website by Die Amigos

References 

German musical groups
Schlager groups
Musical groups established in 1970